The Old Dominion Monarchs men's soccer team is an intercollegiate varsity sports team of Old Dominion University. The team is an NCAA Division I member of the Sun Belt Conference, having joined in 2022 after moving from Conference USA.

Seasons

References

External links

 

 
Soccer clubs in Hampton Roads